William Patrick Perry (born February 4, 1959) is a former pitcher who played in Major League Baseball. He pitched from 1985 to 1990 for the St. Louis Cardinals, Cincinnati Reds, Chicago Cubs and Los Angeles Dodgers.

References

External links 

1959 births
Living people
Arkansas Travelers players
Bakersfield Dodgers players
Baseball players from Illinois
Buffalo Bisons (minor league) players
Chicago Cubs players
Cincinnati Reds players
Columbus Astros players
Daytona Beach Astros players
Gulf Coast Astros players
Iowa Cubs players
Lincoln Land Loggers baseball players
Las Vegas Stars (baseball) players
Los Angeles Dodgers players
Louisville Redbirds players
Major League Baseball pitchers
Omaha Royals players
People from Taylorville, Illinois
Scranton/Wilkes-Barre Red Barons players
Springfield Cardinals players
St. Louis Cardinals players